Theretra perkeo is a moth of the family Sphingidae. It is known from the arid areas north of the equatorial forest belt, from Senegal to northern Uganda.

The length of the forewings is 19–21 mm. It is pinkish-brown with a darker oblique stripe and a parallel series of narrow paler lines from running from the hind margin of the forewing to the vicinity of the apex. The head and body have a dorsal silvery line. The hindwings are
uniform pinkish-brown. The underside is uniform reddish-brown, but paler at the margin.

References

Theretra
Moths described in 1903
Insects of West Africa
Insects of Uganda
Fauna of the Central African Republic
Moths of Africa